The Canton of Criquetot-l'Esneval is a former canton situated in the Seine-Maritime département and in the Haute-Normandie region of northern France. It was disbanded following the French canton reorganisation which came into effect in March 2015. It consisted of 21 communes, which joined the canton of Octeville-sur-Mer in 2015. It had a total of 16,394 inhabitants (2012).

Geography 
A farming and coastal area in the arrondissement of Le Havre, centred on the town of Criquetot-l'Esneval. The altitude varies from 0m (Bénouville) to 137m (Gonneville-la-Mallet) for an average altitude of 104m.

The canton comprised 21 communes:

Angerville-l'Orcher
Anglesqueville-l'Esneval
Beaurepaire
Bénouville
Bordeaux-Saint-Clair
Criquetot-l'Esneval
Cuverville
Étretat
Fongueusemare
Gonneville-la-Mallet
Hermeville
Heuqueville
Pierrefiques
La Poterie-Cap-d'Antifer
Sainte-Marie-au-Bosc
Saint-Jouin-Bruneval
Saint-Martin-du-Bec
Le Tilleul
Turretot
Vergetot
Villainville

Population

See also 
 Arrondissements of the Seine-Maritime department
 Cantons of the Seine-Maritime department
 Communes of the Seine-Maritime department

References

Criquetot-l'Esneval
2015 disestablishments in France
States and territories disestablished in 2015